The year 1678 in music involved some significant events.

Events
January 2 – Public opera in Hamburg begins when the Oper am Gänsemarkt is inaugurated with a performance of Johann Theile's biblical Singspiel .
May 4 – André Campra begins ecclesiastical studies at the age of 17.
June 19 – Guillaume-Gabriel Nivers is appointed to join Nicolas Lebègue, Jacques Thomelin and Jean Buterne as an organists of the Chapelle Royale at the French court.
John Blow becomes a doctor of music.
Seventeen-year-old Giacomo Antonio Perti composes his first opera.
The  is constructed, the grandest opera house in Venice.

Published popular music

Classical music
Albertus Bryne – 5 dance movements
Henry Purcell – 3 Parts upon a Ground, Z.731
Giovanni Buonaventura Viviani – Capricci armonici da chiesa e da camera, Op.4
Bernardo Pasquini – Sant'Agnese
Giovanni Paolo Colonna – Il transito di S. Giuseppe

Opera
Jean-Baptiste Lully 
Psyche
Bellérophon, LWV 57
Johann Theile – .
Carlo Pallavicino – Il Vespasiano
Giovanni Maria Bononcini – Astianatte
 La Despina, Agnelli, Milano 1678, performed in Milan.

Births
March 4 – Antonio Vivaldi,  composer (died 1741)
July 6 – Nicola Francesco Haym, opera librettist and composer (died 1727)
December 30 – William Croft, organist and composer (died 1727)
probable – Manuel de Zumaya, composer (died 1755)

Deaths
March – Jacques Hardel, harpsichordist and composer
August 5 – Juan García de Zéspedes, composer (born 1619)
September 28 – Maurizio Cazzati, Italian composer (born 1616)
November 18 – Giovanni Maria Bononcini, violinist and composer
date unknown
Leonora Duarte, composer
John Jenkins, composer (born 1592)
probable – Chiara Margarita Cozzolani, Benedictine nun and composer (born 1602)

References

 
17th century in music
Music by year